San Nicolò di San Felice is a deconsecrated Roman Catholic church located on via San Felice 41 in Bologna, region of Emilia Romagna, Italy. Bombardment during World War II caused sufficient damage to close the brick walled structure with a front portico.

A church at the site is documented since the 12th-century, when it was located outside the city walls. In 1570, the church was refurbished by Pietro Fiorini and included a canvas depicting a Crucifixion by Annibale Carracci, and now displayed at the church of  Santa Maria della Carità.

In 1753, a further reconstruction, this time by Carlo Francesco Dotti added an iron cross once located on via San Felice, now also housed in Santa Maria della Carità. The nave has 17th-century stuccos.

Bibliography

translated from Italian Wikipedia

Nicolo di San Felice
16th-century Roman Catholic church buildings in Italy